Milan Lach, SJ  (born November 18, 1973) is a Slovak Catholic bishop current appointed as an auxiliary bishop for the Eparchy of Bratislava of the Slovak Greek Catholic Church. He was previously the Eparchal Bishop of Parma in the Ruthenian Greek Catholic Church.

Life
He was born on November 18, 1973 in Kežmarok, a town in the Spiš region of eastern Slovakia.

He studied theology at the TF TU in Bratislava. Lach was ordained a deacon on 11 November 2000, and a priest 1 July 2001, in the Cathedral of the Nativity of the Mother of God in Košice, both by the Eparchal Bishop of Košice Milan Chautur.

From 2001 to 2002, he performed a civilian service in the Jesuit community in Košice and in 2003 he worked at East-West Spirituality Center as a scientist. From 2003 to 2004, he was appointed a head of the East-West Spirituality Center in Košice and at the same time he helped Christians and others in Košice and the surrounding area of Košice.

In 2004, he began his studies at the Pontifical Oriental Institute in Rome, where he obtained a doctorate in 2009. In addition to his experience from the international academic environment, he has also gained experience in spiritual service as a helping hand at the Pontifical College of Russicum and as a spiritual assistant of the Federation of Scouts of Europe in Rome. He also co-authored with Vatican Radio.

After returning from studies in Rome in 2009, he worked as a director at the Center of Spirituality East-West. In addition to securing the scientific tasks of the center, organizing scientific conferences, building a library fund and establishing contacts with other countries institute, he taught one semester at the Faculty of Theology of the Catholic University in Košice, where he also was a member of a theological journal Verba Theologica.

He has been in the Society of Jesus in Slovakia since December 30, 2009. He was a provincial counselor and since January 1, 2012 a delegate for the formation of Jesuit scholastics.

He is fluent in Slovak and Italian, actively communicates in English and Russian and passively in French.

On April 19, 2013, Pope Francis appointed him as an Auxiliary Bishop of Prešov. He was ordained on June 1, 2013, in Ľutina. 

On June 24, 2017, he was appointed by Pope Francis as Apostolic Administrator of the Eparchy of Parma for Byzantines in the United States. On June 1, 2018, Pope Francis named Lach as Eparch of Parma. He was enthroned one month later on July 1.

On January 23, 2023, Pope Francis name him as Auxiliary Bishop of Bratislava and titular bishop of Ostracine.

See also

 Catholic Church hierarchy
 Catholic Church in the United States
 Historical list of the Catholic bishops of the United States
 List of Catholic bishops of the United States
 Lists of patriarchs, archbishops, and bishops

References

Episcopal succession

 

Living people
1973 births
Slovak bishops
Slovak Eastern Catholics
Slovak Jesuits
American Eastern Catholic bishops
Jesuit bishops
Ruthenian Catholic bishops
People from Kežmarok
Slovak people of Rusyn descent
Bishops appointed by Pope Francis
Pontifical Oriental Institute alumni